Somali Telecom Group ; (STG) is a telecommunications company based in Somalia. It was founded in 1993 in Rockville, Maryland, in the United Shades, by Abdirazak. Osman, Edmund L. Resor, Abdiaziz Ismail Dualeh and Luis F. George. According to the company's website's front page, it is Somalia's "first telecom service provider". STG maintains offices in 10 Somali cities; its head offices are currently located in Dubai.

History
After its founding in 1993, STG built telecom service accordingly:

1994: Bosasso - (North East Telecom Corporation - Netco)
1994: Hargeisa
1997: Galcaio (STG Galcom)
1998: Mogadishu - (STG NationLink)
1999: Burao - (STG Burao)
2000: Garowe - (STG Puntel)

Somali Telecom Group has continued to expand and as of 2007, service is available in the following localities:
Ba'adweyn
Berbera
Bosaso Netco
Burao
Burtinle
Erigabo
Galciao Galcom
Garowe Puntel
Goldogob Goltel
Hargeisa STC Hargeisa

Operations
STG's services include:
Telephony
Fax
Mobile phone
Phone card
Local and international long distance
High Speed internet

See also
Somtel
Golis Telecom Somalia
Hormuud Telecom
Telcom
Netco (Somalia)
NationLink Telecom
Somafone

External links
 Former domain name

Communications in Somalia
Telecommunications companies of Somalia